Sheldon Andelson (March 5, 1931 – December 29, 1987) was a higher education administrator and a political fund-raiser.

Biography
Sheldon "Shelley" Andelson was born in the Boyle Heights area of Los Angeles, at the time a Jewish enclave of Los Angeles, and went on to have a lucrative career in law and real estate.  He was the first openly gay University of California Regent.  In describing Andelson, the Los Angeles Times called him a "Democratic Party heavyweight, once regarded as the nation's most influential gay political figure."  Andelson was nominated to the Board of Regents by Governor Jerry Brown.  He survived a nasty confirmation battle and served as a University of California Regent from 1982 to 1987.  He was instrumental in the appointment of one of the first openly gay judges in California, Rand Schrader.  At Andelson's urging, California Governor Jerry Brown appointed Schrader to the Los Angeles Municipal Court in 1980.  Andelson was also a fund-raiser for Senator Edward M. Kennedy and Walter F. Mondale.

Other notable accomplishments, honors and contributions include, founder and Chairman of the Bank of Los Angeles, a member of the Anti-Defamation League of B'nai B'rith, a founder of the Museum of Contemporary Art, director of the ACLU Foundation, and a member of a committee of the 1984 Olympic Games held in Los Angeles. Mr. Andelson was a graduate of Stanford University and USC Law School. Andelson served as a member of the Finance Committee of the Democratic National Committee [DNC] and spoke at the 1980 Democratic National Convention, held in New York City.

Sheldon Andelson was a lead partner in the 1980s trendy Melrose Avenue restaurant "Trumps". At the time, one of Los Angeles' most popular and exclusive dining spots. Andelson was also owner of The 8709 Club Baths, a popular gay nightlife spot.

The Andelson Collection at the University of California, Santa Barbara Library is named in his honor.  Located in the Ethnic and Gender Studies Library, the Collection supports the teaching curriculum and research interests of faculty and students in gay, lesbian, bisexual, transgender and studies across the disciplines.

On December 29, 1987, aged 56, Andelson died of complications related to AIDS.

References

1931 births
1987 deaths
20th-century American Jews
American political fundraisers
LGBT Jews
LGBT people from California
AIDS-related deaths in California
People from Los Angeles
People from Boyle Heights, Los Angeles
University of California regents
20th-century American LGBT people
20th-century American academics